The Emperor Lays an Egg is a non-fiction children's picture book by Brenda Z. Guiberson, with pictures by Joan Paley.

Summary
An emperor penguin father has to protect his egg for two months while the mother is off searching for food. The book has information about the birth cycle of emperor penguins and it has a story of a mother and father caring for their egg.

Reception
A Kirkus Reviews review says, "Although The Emperor's Egg, by Martin Jenkins (1999), covers similar territory, school and public libraries will find this title useful for elementary school science reports, and nature lovers will love the pictures".
It was reviewed by Booklist. and Horn Book Magazine.

References

2001 children's books
Children's non-fiction books
American non-fiction books
American picture books
Zoology books